The many-banded snake (Naja multifasciata), also known commonly as the burrowing cobra, is a species of venomous snake in the family Elapidae. The species is native to Central Africa. There are three recognized subspecies.

Geographic range
N. multifasciata is found in Angola, Cameroon, the Democratic Republic of Congo, Equatorial Guinea, Gabon, the Republic of Congo, and the Central African Republic.

Habitat

Description
The body is moderately slender with a short tail ending in a blunt spike. The head is short, flattened, and slightly distinct from neck; the neck region is not capable of expansion into a hood. The eyes are medium to moderately large. The pupils are round. The dorsal scales are smooth and glossy.

Venom
N. multifasciata is venomous. Its venom is similar to classical cobra venoms and appears to contain both neurotoxins and cardiotoxins.

Reproduction
N. multifasciata is oviparous.

Taxonomy
The genus Paranaja was synonymised with Naja in a recent molecular phylogenetic study, as this species is closely related to the forest cobra (Naja melanoleuca)

Subspecies
Three subspecies are recognized as being valid, including the nominotypical subspecies.
Naja multifasciata anomala Sternfeld, 1917 – Cameroon
Naja multifasciata duttoni (Boulenger, 1904)   
Naja multifasciata multifasciata (F. Werner, 1902)

Nota bene: A trinomial authority in parentheses indicates that the subspecies was originally described in a genus other than Naja.

Etymology
The subspecific name, duttoni, is in honor of British parasitologist Joseph Everett Dutton.

References

Further reading
Boulenger GA (1904). "Descriptions of Two new Elapine Snakes from the Congo". Annals and Magazine of Natural History, Seventh Series 14: 14–15. (Elapechis duttoni, new species, p. 15).
Sternfeld R (1917). "Reptilia und Amphibia". pp. 407–510 + Plates XXII–XXIV. In: Schubotz H (editor) (1917). Wissenschaftliche Ergebnisse der Zweiten Deutschen Zentral-Afrika-Expedition, 1910–1911 unter Führung Adolph Friedrichs, Herzog zu Mecklenburg. Band 1, Zoologie. Leipzig: Klinkhardt & Biermann. 597 pp. + Plates I–XXVII. (Naja anomala, new species, pp. 482–484 + Plate XXIV, figure 9). (in German).
Trape J-F, Roux-Estève R (1995). "Les serpents du Congo: liste commentée et clé de détermination [= Snakes of the Congo: Annotated List and Identification Key]". Journal of African Zoology 109 (1): 31–50. (in French).
Werner F (1902). "Ueber westafrikanische Reptilien ". Verhandlungen der kaiserlich-königlichen zoologisch-botanischen Gesellschaft in Wien 52: 332–348. (Naia multifasciata, new species, p. 347). (in German).

Naja
Snakes of Africa
Reptiles of Angola
Reptiles of Cameroon
Reptiles of the Central African Republic
Reptiles of the Democratic Republic of the Congo
Reptiles of Equatorial Guinea
Reptiles of Gabon
Reptiles of the Republic of the Congo
Reptiles described in 1902
Taxa named by Franz Werner